Aquiflexum balticum  is a bacterium from the genus of Aquiflexum which has been isolated from water from the Baltic Sea.

References

External links
Type strain of Aquiflexum balticum at BacDive -  the Bacterial Diversity Metadatabase	

Cytophagia
Bacteria described in 2004